La Puebla del Río is a city located in the province of Seville, Spain. According to the 2016 census (INE), the city has a population of 11995 inhabitants. With a surface of 377,1 square km and located 15 km away SW from Seville (Sevilla)La Puebla del Río is located 37°16′N, 6°03′W at an altitude of 20m. Products such as rice, oranges, corn, cotton, sunflower or wheat are common crops in this town.

References

External links
La Puebla del Río - Sistema de Información Multiterritorial de Andalucía

Municipalities of the Province of Seville